Armillaria borealis is a species of mushroom in the family Physalacriaceae. Phylogenetic analysis of ribosomal DNA has shown that within the genus Armillaria, this species is most closely related to A. solidipes and A. gemina.

See also 
List of Armillaria species

References 

borealis
Fungal tree pathogens and diseases
Fungi described in 1982